Congrove Field and The Tumps is a  is a  biological Site of Special Scientific Interest (SSSI) on Lansdown Hill, north of Bath in Bath and North East Somerset, notified in 1991.

It is an area of calcareous grassland lying over Oolitic (Jurassic) Limestone covered by shallow, well-drained soils. The Tumps is above Congrove Field, and is believed to be the site of mining activities in the past. The grassland communities present are of the Tor-grass (Brachypodium pinnatum) type showing elements of both the Meadow Oat-grass-wild thyme (Avenula pratensis)–(Thymus praecox) and the Knapweed-Rough Hawkbit (Centaurea nigra)–(Leontodon hispidus) variants.

References

Sites of Special Scientific Interest in Avon
Sites of Special Scientific Interest notified in 1991